Assumption School was a Catholic elementary school in Chicago, Illinois from 1899 to 1945.

Assumption School may also refer to the following schools in the United States:

Assumption School (Saint Paul, Minnesota)

See also
Assumption Catholic High School (disambiguation)
Assumption College (disambiguation)
Assumption High School (disambiguation)
Assumption Preparatory School, Worcester, Massachusetts
Our Lady of the Assumption School, Carencro, Louisiana